Tito Lutwa Okello (1914 – 3 June 1996) was a Ugandan military officer and politician. He was the eighth president of Uganda from 29 July 1985 until 26 January 1986.

Background
Tito Okello was born into an ethnic Acholi family in circa 1914 in Nam Okora, Kitgum District.

He joined the King's African Rifles in 1940 and served in the East African Campaign of World War II. As a career military officer, he had a variety of assignments.

As follower of President Milton Obote, Okello went into exile following the 1971 coup d'état that resulted in Idi Amin becoming Uganda's new ruler. In 1972, rebels invaded Uganda to restore Obote. Okello was one of the leaders of an insurgent group which targeted Masaka. The invasion was defeated by loyalist Uganda Army troops.

Okello took part in the Uganda–Tanzania War. He was one of the commanders in the coalition between the Tanzania People's Defence Force and the Uganda National Liberation Army (UNLA) that removed Amin from power in 1979. In 1980, Obote was restored to presidency. Okello was selected to be the Commander of the UNLA from 1980 to 1985.

Coup d'état
In July 1985, together with Bazilio Olara-Okello, Tito Lutwa Okello staged the coup d'état that toppled President Obote. He ruled as president for six months until he had to transfer power to the National Resistance Army (NRA) operating under the leadership of the current president, Yoweri Museveni. He went into exile in Kenya after his tenure was forcefully terminated by Museveni.

Extended family
Tito Okello's son Henry Oryem Okello is the current State Minister for Foreign Affairs responsible for International Affairs. In 2002, Tito Okello's younger brother, Erisanweri Opira, was abducted from his home in Kitgum District by the rebel group, the Lord's Resistance Army (LRA). His abduction was considered unusual as the LRA usually kidnapped teenagers and young people to use as prospective soldiers or sex slaves. Opira was in his late seventies when he was abducted.

Final years
Okello remained in exile until 1993, when he was granted amnesty by President Museveni and returned to Kampala. He died three years later, of an undisclosed illness, on 3 June 1996. He was almost 82 years old at the time of his death. His remains were buried at his ancestral home in Kitgum District.

Legacy and honours
In January 2010, Okello was posthumously awarded the Kagera National Medal of Honor for fighting against the Idi Amin dictatorship in the 1970s.

See also
Uganda since 1979, part of the History of Uganda series.
President of Uganda
Politics of Uganda
Okello Oryem

References

External links
 Analysis of Uganda's Political and Military Turmoil in the 1970s and 1980s

1910s births
1996 deaths
Acholi people
British Army personnel of World War II
British colonial army soldiers
King's African Rifles officers
Leaders who took power by coup
Military personnel of the Uganda–Tanzania War
People from Kitgum District
Presidents of Uganda
Ugandan exiles
Ugandan generals